Latin translation may refer to:

Bible translations into Latin
Latin translations of the 12th century
Tirukkuṟaḷ translations into Latin
List of Latin translations of modern literature